Adrien Pélissié (born 7 August 1990) is a French rugby union player. His position is hooker and he currently plays for Clermont Auvergne in the Top 14.

References

External links
UBB profile
L'Équipe profile

1990 births
Living people
French rugby union players
Union Bordeaux Bègles players
ASM Clermont Auvergne players
Rugby union hookers
France international rugby union players
Sportspeople from Tarn-et-Garonne
Stade Aurillacois Cantal Auvergne players